Niels Høiby (born 1941) is a Danish physician, professor and politician.  He specialises in microbiology and was a pioneer in the study of biofilms and their role in conditions such as cystic fibrosis. He worked for many years as a department head at Denmark's largest hospital, the Rigshospitalet.

He was briefly a member of the Danish parliament, having been a runner-up in the 2007 election and so taking the seat for the Liberal Alliance when Malou Aamund changed party in 2011. Niels Høiby was decorated as a knight of the Order of the Dannebrog in 2012. He was a member of the council for the capital region.

Books and papers
 Pseudomonas Aeruginosa Infection in Cystic Fibrosis (1977)
 Det danske sundhedsvæsens storhed og fald (1999), on the rise and fall of the Danish health service
 Antibiotic resistance of bacterial biofilms (2010)
 A personal history of research on microbial biofilms and biofilm infections (2014)

References

External links
 Bacteria and biofilms – Coursera interview
 Niels Høiby – profile at the University of Copenhagen

1941 births
Danish medical researchers
Danish physicians
Living people
Liberal Alliance (Denmark) politicians
Members of the Folketing 2007–2011
People from Copenhagen